Josephine Wratten (born 23 March 1992) is a British rower. She was born in Middlesbrough and was a member of the nearby Tees Rowing Club in Stockton-on-Tees, England.

She was scouted by World Class Start and began rowing at the age of 16. After becoming a regular in the Great British senior setup Josephine relocated to Henley and joined Leander Club.

Achievements

Great Britain 

 2019, Silver, European Championships, Lucerne (W8+)
 2018, 4th, European Championships, Glasgow (W4-)
 2017, 5th, World Championships, Sarasota-Bradenton (W8+)
 2017, Bronze, World Rowing Cup III, Lucerne (W8+)
 2017, Silver, World Rowing Cup II, Poznan (W8+)
 2017, 4th, European Championships, Racice (W8+)

U23 

 2012, 4th, U23 World Championships, Trakai 
 2013, Silver, U23 World Championships, Linz (W8+)
 2014, 5th, U23 World Championships, Varese (W4x)

Teesside University 

 2013, Bronze, European University Championships, Poznan (W1x)

Other 

 2012, Winner, Henley Women's Regatta (Elite W8+)
 2013, Winner, Henley Women's Regatta (Elite W8+)

References 

British female rowers
1992 births
Living people